Anisus septemgyratus is a species of air-breathing freshwater snail, an aquatic pulmonate gastropod mollusk in the family Planorbidae, the ram's horn snails.

Taxonomy
Glöer (2002) considered Anisus septemgyratus (Rossmässler, 1835) as a junior synonym of Anisus leucostoma (Millet, 1813). Later Glöer & Meier-Brook (2008) used name Anisus septemgyratus again.

Horsák et al. (2013) consider Anisus calculiformis (Sandberger, 1874) as a synonym of Anisus septemgyratus.

Distribution
This species occurs in countries and islands including:

 Czech Republic – in Moravia, critically endangered (CR)
 Slovakia
 Poland
 British Isles

Description
The number of prostate diverticles ranges from 30 to more than 50.

References

External links
Anisus septemgyratus at Animalbase

Planorbidae
Gastropods described in 1835